The MV California Star is a ship in the Blue Star Line.

California Star may also refer to:
California Star, an ancestor newspaper of The Daily Alta California
 California Star (album), a 2012 album by British band Martin Stephenson and the Daintees

See also
California Star (ship), a list of ships named California Star
California (disambiguation)